Robert-Jan Derksen (born 3 January 1974) is a Dutch professional golfer.

Derksen was born in Nijmegen. He won the Dutch Amateur Championship four years in a row from 1993 to 1996 and turned professional in 1996.

Derksen began his professional career on the Asian Tour in 1997. At the end of the year, he returned to Europe and earned his European Tour card for the 1998 season via qualifying school. He initially struggled to maintain his place on the main tour and has returned to qualifying school on five occasions. He has not always been successful in regaining his card, dropping down to the second tier Challenge Tour twice, where he finished 8th on the end of season rankings in 2001. His first win on the European Tour came in 2003 at the prestigious Dubai Desert Classic. His only other title to date was the 2005 Madeira Island Open Caixa Geral de Depositos, a European and Challenge tour dual ranking event.

His best year-end ranking on the Order of Merit has been 36th in 2007.

In 2014 he said that he planned to retire at the end of the season.

Amateur wins (5)
1993 Dutch Amateur Championship
1994 Dutch Amateur Championship
1995 Dutch Amateur Championship
1996 Dutch Amateur Championship, Dutch Amateur Stroke Play Championship

Professional wins (2)

European Tour wins (2)

1Dual-ranking event with the Challenge Tour

Challenge Tour wins (1)

1Dual-ranking event with the European Tour

Results in major championships

Note: Derksen only played in The Open Championship.
CUT = missed the half-way cut

Results in World Golf Championships

"T" = Tied

Team appearances
Amateur
European Youths' Team Championship (representing the Netherlands): 1994
Eisenhower Trophy (representing the Netherlands): 1994

Professional
World Cup (representing the Netherlands): 2001, 2004, 2005, 2007, 2011, 2013

References

External links
 

Dutch male golfers
European Tour golfers
Sportspeople from Nijmegen
Sportspeople from North Holland
People from Blaricum
1974 births
Living people
21st-century Dutch people